KLIZ-FM (107.5 FM, "The Power Loon") is a classic rock music formatted radio station serving the Brainerd Lakes area from Brainerd, Minnesota. Its owner is Hubbard Broadcasting, Inc.

KLIZ-FM is a sister station to KVBR 1340 (Business News/Talk), KLIZ 1380 (Sports), KBLB 93.3 (Country), KUAL-FM 103.5 (Oldies), WJJY-FM 106.7 (Adult Contemporary). All are located at 13225 Dogwood Drive, Baxter.

Hubbard Broadcasting announced on November 13, 2014 that it would purchase the Omni Broadcasting stations, including KLIZ-FM. The sale was completed on February 27, 2015, at a purchase price of $8 million for the 16 stations and one translator.

Previous logos

References

External links
KLIZ The Power Loon

Radio stations in Minnesota
Classic rock radio stations in the United States
Radio stations established in 1960
1960 establishments in Minnesota
Hubbard Broadcasting